The Bulls Road Cemetery is a military cemetery located in the Somme region of France commemorating British and Commonwealth soldiers who fought in the Battle of the Somme in World War I. The cemetery contains mostly those who died manning the front line near the village of Flers between September 1916 and March 1917 and between March 1918 and September 1918. The cemetery is managed by the Commonwealth War Graves Commission.

Location 
The cemetery is located approximately half a kilometer outside of Flers, which is approximately 8 kilometers northeast of Albert, France.

Fighting near Bulls Road and Flers 

Flers was captured on 15 September 1916 by the British 41st Division and New Zealand Division in the Battle of Flers-Courcelette, which was incidentally the world's first significant combat action that featured tank warfare. The village was taken by the Germans in their 1918 spring offensive, but had been retaken by the 10th West Yorks and the 6th Dorsets of the British 17th Division by the end of August 1918.

Establishment of the Cemetery 
The cemetery was begun on 19 September 1916 and was used by Commonwealth units, especially the Australians, until March 1917. In September 1918, the 17th division reburied soldiers killed in the previous 6 months in the cemetery. After the war, graves from fields between Flers and the village of Longueval were reburied in the cemetery. The cemetery was designed by Sir Herbert Baker.

Statistics 
The cemetery contains a total of 776 burials, of which 475 are identified and 296 are unidentified. Special memorials are dedicated to 15 soldiers (8 from Australia, 5 from the UK, and 2 from New Zealand) believed to be buried among the unknown.

References 

World War I cemeteries in France
Somme (department)